Santos FC (Guyana) is a Guyanese professional football club based in Georgetown. Founded in 1964, the club competes in the GFF Elite League, the top league of football in Guyana.

References 

Football clubs in Guyana

it:Santos (disambigua)#Sport